Matelea fimbriatiflora is a species of plant in the family Apocynaceae. It is endemic to Ecuador.  Its natural habitat is subtropical or tropical moist lowland forests. It is threatened by habitat loss.

References

fimbriatiflora
Endemic flora of Ecuador
Endangered plants
Taxonomy articles created by Polbot